Aminata Adialin Bangura (born 1994) is a Sierra Leonean model and beauty pageant titleholder who was crowned as the winner of the 2016 edition of the Miss Sierra Leone pageant.

Early life and education
Born in Port Loko District, Sierra Leone, Bangura studied sociology at the University of Sierra Leone.

Pageantry

Miss Sierra Leone 2016
Whilst representing Port Loko District, Bangura was crowned winner of the 2016 edition of Miss Sierra Leone pageant that was held on 21 May at the Bintumani Conference Centre in Freetown. This result qualified her to represent her country at the Miss World 2016 pageant held on December 18 at the MGM National Harbor, Oxon Hill, Maryland, United States.

Miss World 2019
She represented Sierra Leone at the Miss World 2016 pageant but failed to place.

References

External links
Aminata Bangura on Miss Sierra Leone 2019
 Miss World official website

1994 births
Living people
Miss World 2016 delegates
Sierra Leonean beauty pageant winners
People from Port Loko District